Membracinae is a subfamily of treehoppers in the family Membracidae. There are more than 40 genera in Membracinae.

Genera
These 44 genera belong to the subfamily Membracinae:

 Acanthicoides Metcalf, 1952 c g
 Aconophora Fairmaire, 1846 c g b
 Alchisme Kirkaldy, 1904 c g
 Bolbonota Amyot & Serville, 1843 c g
 Bolbonotodes Fowler, 1894 c g
 Calloconophora Dietrich, 1991 c g
 Campylenchia Stål, 1869 c g b
 Cladonota Stål, 1869 c g
 Enchenopa Amyot & Audinet-Serville, 1843 c g b
 Enchophyllum Amyot & Serville, 1843 c g
 Erechtia Walker, 1858 c g
 Eunusa Pinto da Fonseca, 1974 c g
 Folicarina Sakakibara, 1992 c g
 Guayaquila Goding, 1920 c g
 Havilandia Dietrich & McKamey, 1995 c g
 Hypsoprora Stål, 1869 c g b
 Hypsoprorachis Fonseca & Diringshofen, 1969 c g
 Jibarita Ramos, 1957 c g
 Kronides Kirkaldy, 1904 c g
 Leioscyta Fowler, 1894 c g b
 Lewdeitzia Dietrich & McKamey, 1995 c g
 Membracis Fabricius, 1775 c g
 Metcalfiella Linnavuori, 1955 c g
 Microschema Stål, 1869 c g
 Notocera Amyot & Serville, 1843 c g
 Ochropepla Stål, 1869 c g
 Paragara Goding, 1926 c g
 Philya Walker, 1858 c g b
 Phyllotropis Stål, 1869 c g
 Platycotis Stål, 1869 c g b
 Potnia Stål, 1866 c g
 Potnioides Creao-Duarte, 1997 c g
 Pseuderechtia Sakakibara, 2012
 Ramosella McKamey & Deitz, 1996 c g
 Sakakibarella Creao-Duarte, 1997 c g
 Scalmophorus Fowler, 1894 c g
 Stalotypa Metcalf, 1927 c g
 Stirpis McKamey & Deitz, 1996 c g
 Talipes Deitz, 1975
 Tritropidia Stãl, 1869 c g
 Tropidoscyta Stål, 1869 g
 Turrialbia McKamey & Deitz, 1996 c g
 Tylopelta Fowler, 1894 c g b
 Umbonia Burmeister, 1835 c g b

Data sources: i = ITIS, c = Catalogue of Life, g = GBIF, b = Bugguide.net

References

Further reading

External links

 

 
Hemiptera subfamilies